All India Bar Examination is an examination conducted by Bar Council of India for law graduates willing to start practice of Lawyer. The candidate will be awarded certificate of practice after clearing the examination and is eligible to practice in any court in India. The exam is conducted in 53 cities of India in national and regional languages.

Objective 

All India Bar Examination is certification exam conducted once a year by Bar Council of India for law graduates willing to start practice of profession as Lawyer. The exam is conducted in 53 cities having 261 centres as an open book exam. The exam is conducted to assess basic level knowledge of a member and lay down minimum benchmark for entering into practice of law in addition to  assessing candidate's analytical skills. After clearing 
All India Bar Examination, the candidate is awarded certificate of practice by Bar Council of India. Qualified member in the exam can attend court hearings in any tribunals courts and administrative bodies. The exam is in multi-choice model and conducted offline in 3 and half hours duration.

Eligibility 

All India Bar Examination can be attended on below eligibility:

 Members should hold a law degree (3-Year/5-Year) from a recognised institute of law approved by the Bar Council of India.
 Should have been registered with their respective State Bar Councils.
 No upper age limit for appearing in the exam.
AIBE eligibility criteria refers to the minimum academic qualification a seeker must retain, age limit, and State Bar Council Enrollment etc. BCI permits handiest the ones applicants who meet all of the eligibility standards of AIBE exam.

Procedure 

All India Bar Examination can be attended after completion of below procedures by eligible candidates:

 All India Bar Examination Registration.
 Applying before last date for appearing in All India Bar Examination.
 Attending Exam.
 All India Bar Examination Provisional Answer Key is released.
 Any discrepancies in Provisional Answer Key can be challenged before last date for the same.
 Results announcements by Bar Council of India.

Above schedule will be followed annually for All India Bar Examination.

Languages 
All India Bar Examination is conducted in Hindi, Telugu, Tamil, Kannada, Marathi, Bengali, Gujarati, Oriya, English, Assamese, Punjabi languages.

See also 

Bar Council of India.

References

External links 
 Official Website

Law of India
 
Examinations in India